Swedish Translators in North America or STiNA was founded in 2004  with support from the Consulate General of Sweden in New York for the promotion of translation of Swedish into English and coordination with the British equivalent group  SELTA (the Swedish-English Literary Translators' Association) and the Swedish cultural institutions.

Footnotes

External links

 SELTA

Swedish culture
North American literature